Edmund Blundell may refer to:

 Edmund Augustus Blundell (1804–1868), British diplomat
 Edmund Blundell (priest) (1896–1961), Anglican clergyman in South Africa